Maksim Vitalyevich Chebotar (born 16 November 1982) is a retired Moldovan professional football player.

External links
 
 

1982 births
Living people
Moldovan footballers
Moldovan expatriate footballers
Expatriate footballers in Russia
Expatriate footballers in Uzbekistan
Expatriate footballers in Belarus
Expatriate footballers in Kazakhstan
FC Rapid Ghidighici players
FC Nasaf players
FC Torpedo-BelAZ Zhodino players
FC Okzhetpes players
FC Iskra-Stal players
FC Tiraspol players
FC Saxan players
FC Tighina players
Association football defenders